Dolphin Sands is a rural locality in the local government area (LGA) of Glamorgan–Spring Bay in the South-east LGA region of Tasmania. The 2016 census recorded a population of 126 for the state suburb of Dolphin Sands.

History 
Dolphin Sands is a confirmed locality.

Geography
The southern boundary follows the shoreline of Great Oyster Bay. The eastern boundary and much of the northern follows the channel that leads to Moulting Lagoon and the Swan River.

Road infrastructure 
Route A3 (Tasman Highway) passes to the west. From there, Swan River Road and Dolphin Sands Road provide access to the locality.

See also
 Moulting Lagoon Important Bird Area

References

Towns in Tasmania
Localities of Glamorgan–Spring Bay Council